Gillingham is a large town in the unitary authority area of Medway in the ceremonial county of Kent, England. The town forms a conurbation with neighbouring towns Chatham, Rochester, Strood and Rainham. It is also the largest town in the borough of Medway.

Etymology
The first letter of the town's name is pronounced with a soft 'g' (as in 'ginger'), compared to the hard 'g' (as in 'girl') used for Gillingham, Dorset and Gillingham, Norfolk. In some older texts, it is referred to as Jillyingham Water. The name probably originates from the Gylling næs in Jutland. The suffix -ingas is the Latinized version of inge, an ethnonym for the Ingaevones.  The suffix -ham is the Old English for "homestead, village, manor or estate." The suffix -hamm is the Old English for enclosure, land hemmed by water or marsh or higher ground, land in a riverbend, river­meadow or promontory". Both appear as -ham in modern place-names. Attributions to a personal name Gilla are examples of non-historical founding myths.

Status
Gillingham became an urban district under the Local Government Act 1894, gaining municipal borough status in 1903. John Robert Featherby was the first mayor of the Borough of Gillingham. In 1928 Rainham was added to the Gillingham Borough. Under the Local Government Act 1972 it became a non-metropolitan district covering Gillingham, Hempstead, Wigmore and Rainham. This district was abolished in 1998 before it merged with the other Medway Towns (in the City of Rochester-upon-Medway district) under the 1990s UK local government reform, to become part of the Medway unitary authority.

Town hall
The Municipal Buildings in Canterbury Street were built as council offices for Gillingham Borough Council. They were opened by the Lord Mayor of London, Sir George Broadbridge, on 25 September 1937. The Lord Mayor was received at Gillingham Railway Station by a guard of honour of boys of HMS Arethusa. Before the Second World War, air raid sirens were placed on the Municipal Buildings, and the local Civil Defence headquarters were in a single-storey building, to the rear of the car park. In about 1953, beneath part of the car park, Gillingham Borough Control Centre was built underground.

When Gillingham Borough Council later merged with Rochester upon Medway to form the unitary Medway Authority in 1998, the buildings were still used as council offices and for meetings for several years afterwards. Later, Medway Council then moved into the former Lloyd's of London headquarters at Chatham Gun Wharf, and the Municipal Buildings were considered surplus to requirements. They were sold off in 2008 under a contract which turned them into a residential care home.

Geography
The town grew along the road from Brompton on the great lines (military barracks), to the railway station. As such it was a linear development. Close by was the road along the shore line, linking The Strand, and the tiny village of Gillingham Green. Later, communities developed along the top road - Watling Street – turnpike linking Chatham with Dover. All these communities merged into the town that is called today Gillingham.

Climate
Gillingham experiences an oceanic climate (Köppen climate classification Cfb) similar to almost all of the United Kingdom. Due to its southerly, sheltered, marine position near the European continent the climate is among the warmest in the whole of England.

History
The name Gillingham is recorded in the Domesday book of 1086. It is said to have been named after a warlord, Gyllingas—from the old English gyllan, meaning "to shout". He was a notable man in Kent history as he led his warriors into battle screaming and shouting. At the time of the Norman Conquest, Gillingham was given to the half-brother of William I of England, Odo, Bishop of Bayeux, who rebuilt the parish church at Gillingham and constructed an Archbishop's Palace on land bordered by Grange Road, the ruins of which could still be seen in the last century. At the time Gillingham itself was a small hamlet, built around the parish church and surrounded by large farm-holdings, of which St. Mark's Parish formed part, being part of Brittain Farm.

William Adams mentioned Gillingham in his writings, saying: "... two English
miles from Rochester and one mile from Chatham, where the King's ships do lie". Adams was baptised at Gillingham Parish Church on 24 September 1564.

 The Strand was once owned by the Davenport family in 1635, the Davenport family included a Mayor of Gillingham, pie makers and key holders of Gillingham. The Davenport family had a road named after them in 1920. The Davenport estate was in Ashford, Kent. The estate comprised around 15000 acres and was called The Davenport Manor. The Davenports lost the estate in 1889. The Davenport family were among the investors in the Chatham Dockyard.
In medieval times the part of Gillingham known as Grange was a limb of the Cinque Ports and the maritime importance of the area continued until the late 1940s. Indeed, a large part of Chatham Dockyard lay within Gillingham, and when it was closed in 1984, two-thirds of the then modern-day dockyard lay within the boundaries of Gillingham. The dockyard was founded by Queen Elizabeth I on the site of the present gun wharf, the establishment being transferred to the present site about 1622. In 1667 a Dutch fleet sailed up the River Medway and, having landed at Queenborough on the Isle of Sheppey and laying siege to the fort at Sheerness, invaded Gillingham in what became known as the raid on the Medway. The Dutch eventually retreated, but the incident caused great humiliation to the Royal Navy.

The Seven Years' War began in 1756 and the government immediately gave orders for the defence of the dockyard; by 1758 the Chatham Lines of Defence were built. Over a mile long, they stretched across the neck of the dockyard peninsula, from Chatham Reach, south of the dockyard, across to Gillingham Reach on the opposite side. One of the redoubts on the Lines was at Amherst. The batteries faced away from the dockyard itself to forestall an attack from the landward side; the ships and shore-mounted guns on the river were considered sufficient to protect from that side. The lines of defence are now part of the Great Lines Heritage Park and also the Lower Lines Park (near MidKent College, Gillingham Campus).

War with France began again in 1778, and once more it was necessary to strengthen the defences. Fort Amherst was the first to be improved; it was followed by work beginning in 1800 to add others at Fort Pitt, Chatham, plus Fort Delce and Fort Clarence (both in Rochester); later in the 19th century others were added, including one at Fort Darland in Gillingham. This work, and the expansion of the dockyard, meant that more homes were needed for the workers. The position of the Lines meant that this building could only happen beyond, and so New Brompton came into being. The population rose to 9,000 people by 1851.

Gillingham was still only a small village; eventually it, too, was swallowed up, and the name of the whole settlement changed to Gillingham. In the 1891 census its population was 27,809, and in 1901, it was 42,530.

In 1919, after World War I, a naval war memorial in the shape of a white stone obelisk was set up on the Great Lines. Additional structures were added in 1945 to commemorate the dead of World War II. Similar monuments stand in the dockyard towns of Portsmouth and Plymouth.

Disasters
Gillingham has been the scene of two notable disasters: on 11 July 1929 a public demonstration by Gillingham Fire Brigade went wrong, resulting in 15 fatalities; and in the 1951 Gillingham bus disaster, 24 Royal Marine cadets aged 10 to 13 were killed in a road accident.

Economy

The main source of employment was at Chatham Dockyard, two-thirds of which lay within the boundaries of Gillingham. When it ceased to be a naval base in 1984, there was significant unemployment. A World Heritage Site application has been made for the Dockyard and its defences. Since the 1980s, Gillingham has rebuilt its economic base and the Gillingham Business Park was set up  from the town centre, to attract investments and diversify economic activity. The business park and Ice Rink were an early commision for Grimshaw Architects.

Gillingham has a marina called Gillingham Marina. Gillingham is an important retail centre serving a substantial part of Medway. The town has a large street market in the High Street on Saturdays and Mondays, and is the busiest in the whole of Medway.

Transport

Roads

The Roman road now known as Watling Street passes through Gillingham; and until the opening of the Medway Towns bypass (the M2 motorway) in the mid-1960s the same route was followed by the traffic on the A2 to Dover. That road had been turnpiked in 1730, as part of the London–Canterbury coaching route.

In June 1996 the Medway Tunnel opened, giving Gillingham a second link to the M2 and Strood.

Railways

The London, Chatham & Dover Railway opened its line between Chatham and Faversham on 25 January 1858; and a country station was opened here called New Brompton. This was to serve the dockyard labourers' homes that had sprung up during the Napoleonic Wars. A branch line led into the dockyard. The station later became Gillingham railway station.

Services improved significantly when in July 1939, Gillingham became the terminus of the electrified system of the Southern Railway.

Trams
Gillingham was served by an electric tram system operated by the Chatham and District Light Railways Company from 1902 to 1930.

Culture

Library
Gillingham Public Library is located in the High Street.

Sport

The town is home to Gillingham F.C., who play at Priestfield Stadium and were first elected to the Football League in 1920 as members of the new Football League Third Division (south). They were voted out of the league in 1938, only to be re-elected when the league expanded in 1950. They spent the next 50 years moving between the two lower divisions before finally reaching the second tier (then Division One) in the 1999–2000 season after beating Wigan Athletic in the Play-Off Final at Wembley. They spent five years at this level before being relegated twice, and currently play in League One (third tier), into which they were promoted after winning their first championship for fifty years in the 2012–13 season under manager Martin Allen. They were relegated to EFL League Two in 2022.

The area boasts a sub-regional sports centre (the Black Lion Leisure Centre, now Medway Park) with three indoor pools for swimming and SCUBA diving, gym, sports hall and squash courts also in the same area is Jumpers Rebound Centre for trampolining a world-famous facility for the sport.

There is an outdoors sporting centre located at the Strand which provides sailing and motor boat courses for both adults and children. The Strand Leisure Park has an open-air swimming pool on the banks of the River Medway as well as other leisure attractions including tennis courts and a narrow-gauge railway.

Gillingham Ice Bowl is the home ice rink for Kent's premier Ice Hockey Club, the Invicta Dynamos, who were originally called the Medway Bears. The Ice Bowl was officially opened by Her Majesty the Queen in 1984.

Modern Pentathlon World Cup 2010

The Medway Park leisure centre (formerly the Black Lion) hosted the Modern Pentathlon World Cup. In the Women's Final, it was won by Amelie Caze of France, Donata Rimsaite of Lithuania got Silver (2nd place) and Mhairi Spence of Great Britain got Bronze (3rd place). In the Men's Final, it was won by Ádám Marosi of Hungary, Ondrej Polivka (Czech Republic) got Silver and Alexander Lesun (Russia) claimed the Bronze.

Modern Pentathlon European Championships 2011
These were also held in Medway Park.
Andrei Moiseev (of Russia) got Gold for the Men's Final, Serguei Karyakin (also of Russia) got Silver and Dmytro Kirpulyanskyy (of Ukraine) got the Bronze. James Cooke of GB was a close fourth.
In the Women's Final, Lena Schoneborn (of Germany) got Gold, Adrienn Tóth (of Hungary) got Silver and Victoria Tereshuk (of Ukraine) claimed Bronze.

Local media

Newspapers
Local newspapers for Gillingham include the Medway Messenger, published by the KM Group. The area also has free newspapers in the Medway Extra (KM Group) and yourmedway (KOS Media).In 2011, Medway News and Medway Standard, both published by Kent Regional News and Media, closed down.

Radio
The local commercial radio station for Gillingham is KMFM Medway, owned by the KM Group. Medway is also served by community radio station Radio Sunlight. The area can also receive the county wide stations BBC Radio Kent, Heart and Gold and Smooth, as well as many radio stations in Essex and Greater London.

Education

The Gillingham Boys Grammar School, which was opened in 1923, later became The Howard School in 1975, when it merged with the Rainham Campus secondary school for boys. Other secondary schools include Rainham Mark Grammar School (formerly the Gillingham Technical School), Brompton Academy (formerly New Brompton College and before that Upbury Arts College, Upbury Manor), Rainham Girls School, Chatham Grammar School for Girls and the Robert Napier School. 
There are also three primary schools in the small residential area called Twydall: Twydall Infant School, Twydall Junior School and St Thomas of Canterbury R.C. School. In Gillingham itself are St. Mary's, Barnsole Road, Woodlands, Byron, and Napier Community Primary Schools. In Wigmore, there is the Fairview Infants and Junior Schools and in Hempstead, the Hempstead Infant and Junior Schools.

Gillingham also hosts MidKent College, a Further Education College which introduced Higher Education courses in 2012 and Universities at Medway, a university campus complex comprising University of Kent, Canterbury Christ Church University and University of Greenwich on the former HMS Pembroke barracks buildings.

See List of schools in Medway for a full list of schools serving Gillingham and the Medway area.

Religion

Within Gillingham there are many churches from different Christian denominations. There are three Church of England churches: the historic parish church of St. Mary Magdalene; the evangelical St. Mark's; and St. Augustine's. There are also Baptist, Methodist and Roman Catholic churches.

The Parish Church of St Mary Magdalene ("The Church on the Green",) is the oldest building in Gillingham and Grade II* Listed.
The Normans built the church in the early 13th century, then in the 15th century a tower was added. More extensions were added during the 14th century. In 1700, Philip Wightman was commissioned to cast and hang a ring of five bells, to the tower. Then in 1737, Richard Phelps added another bell to complete a ring of six. Edward Hasted refers to it in 1798, ‘three isles and three chancels, with a handsome tower steeple at the west end’'. In 1811, Thomas Mears added two treble bells to make eight. In 1868, architect Sir Arthur Blomfield restored the church and tower and to mark the completion of the restoration, the firm of Heaton, Butler and Bayne replaced the stained glass in the east window, based on a design by Henry Holiday.

In 1896, Our Lady of Gillingham Roman Catholic Church was built close to Saint Mary Magdalene Church, and overlooks the River Medway.

It followed after other Roman Catholic churches in the area, the closest, St Michael's in Chatham (built 1863). Our Lady of Gillingham was built on the town of New Brompton, as Gillingham was then called, to mainly cater for the new workforce – those employed at Chatham Dockyard. The church itself was started in 1890, and was completed by 1896, being opened on 12 May 1896.

A local Roman Catholic school was established on the site of the church in 1894. The schoolrooms were used until 1972, when the infant section of the school relocated to nearby Greenfield Road. In 1988, after more building work on the new site, the whole school was reunited on its new site at Greenfield Road. The Church (Our Lady of Gillingham) celebrated its centenary in May 1996, two years after the local school.

Gillingham also has the Jāmi’ah mosque and a Hindu Sabha Mandir.

James Jershom Jezreel, founder of the Jezreelite sect which flourished in the area during the 19th century, began the building of Jezreel's Tower on Chatham Hill. The tower was never completed but stood until its demolition in 1961. There is still a Jezreels Road off Watling Street. The tower was painted by Tristram Hillier in 1937 as part of a series of posters for Royal Dutch Shell. A copy is held in Tate Britain.

Military
Brompton Barracks have long been the home of the Royal Engineers. Today Gillingham is home to the Royal Engineers Museum.

Notable people associated with Gillingham

 William Adams – nautical adventurer, advisor to Tokugawa Ieyasu, western samurai
 David Bell – Victoria Cross recipient
 Ryan Bertrand – UEFA Champions League winner with Chelsea FC
 Sara Forbes Bonetta – princess and god-daughter to Queen Victoria, lived for six years in Palm Cottage, Canterbury Street.
 William Cuffay – chartist
 Nicholas Day – actor.
 H. D. Everett, novelist, born in Gillingham
 David Frost – television presenter.
 Hector Gray GC – RAF officer posthumously awarded the George Cross for conduct under torture by the Japanese army in 1943.
 John Hartnell – explorer on Franklin's lost expedition to find the Northwest Passage
 David Harvey – eminent human geographer.
 Jack Hues – musician, most notably as the lead singer of new wave band Wang Chung
 James Jordan – professional dancer, appears on Strictly Come Dancing
 James McCudden – World War I flying ace
 Fernley Marrison – first-class cricketer and British Army officer
 Brian Moore – sport commentator and journalist
 Dee Murray – bass player with Elton John
 Paul Nihill – Four-time Olympian, European champion, Olympic silver medallist and world record holding racewalker
 Stel Pavlou – novelist and screenwriter
 Gary Rhodes – chef and restaurateur
 Vaughan Smith – journalist (founder of Frontline Club), organic farmer who is giving refuge to Julian Assange
 R. N. Taber – poet and novelist
 Rosemary Tonks, poet and novelist, born in Gillingham
 Rik Waller – singer, seen on reality TV show Pop Idol in 2003.

Twin towns
  — Ito and Yokosuka (Japan), the latter being the burial place of William Adams.

See also
 Medway
 Strood
 Rochester
 Chatham
 Rainham
 Gillingham Football Club
 Gillingham Borough Council elections for the political history of the borough covering the town which was abolished in 1998.

Notes

References

External links

 Archive Images

 
Towns in Kent
Former non-metropolitan districts of Kent
Unparished areas in Kent
Former boroughs in England
Medway
Populated coastal places in Kent